Animism is the worldview that non-human entities possess a spiritual essence.

Animism may also refer to:

 Subterranean Animism, a 2008 game in the Touhou Project series
 Animism: The Gods' Lake, an alternate reality game
 Animism (TV series), based on the game
 Animism (album), a 2014 album by Tanya Tagaq

See also
Animeism, a Japanese network programming block